Kinross is a burgh in Perth and Kinross, Scotland, around  south of Perth and around  northwest of Edinburgh. It is the traditional county town of the historic county of Kinross-shire.

History

Kinross's origins are connected with the nearby Loch Leven and its islands whose history goes back to the 5th century AD.  Kinross developed as a staging post on the Great North Road from North Queensferry to Perth. In time, local industry developed and by the early 18th century the town had grown to a population of around 600 people. By the mid-19th century, a thriving wool weaving industry had emerged. Kinross Town Hall was completed in 1841.

Location and transport
The site of the original Pre-Reformation parish church and churchyard are located down a small wynd overlooking Loch Leven, a little away from the town. The church was dedicated to St. Serf and was under control of Dunfermline Abbey. Noteworthy ministers included John Colden from 1593 to 1640 and his son George Colden who served until 1665. The notorious Henry Christie was minister of Kinross 1679–89.

Rev Robert McGill served 1698 until 1726 and recorded supernatural events in the manse in 1718. Rev Robert Stark was initially unpopular but served 1732 to 1783.

Kinross was originally linked by railway to Perthshire, Fife and Clackmannanshire until the rail links gradually disappeared. At one time three independent railway companies had their termini at the town. The Fife and Kinross Railway came from the east, the Kinross-shire Railway came from the south and The Devon Valley Railway came from the west. Kinross Junction railway station once stood on the line between Perth and Edinburgh, which was closed to make way for construction of the M90 motorway. Since this time, many people working within a commuting radius of Kinross have settled in the town owing to its central location and local amenities. Locals and Members of the Scottish Parliament (MSPs) have also asked the Scottish Government to publish a Feasibility Study into re-establishing the Perth–Edinburgh Direct Rail Link. , no such document has been published.

Kinross is served by local and long-distance bus services including Megabus services M90, M91 and M92 which call at the Sainsbury's Park & Ride site off Junction 6 of the M90 motorway.

Tourism
The burgh is located on the shores of Loch Leven. There are boat trips around the loch and to Loch Leven Castle where Mary, Queen of Scots was held prisoner in 1567.

Up to 2014 the annual T in the Park music festival. which was officially replaced by TRNSMT festival in Glasgow Green, was held nearby, at the former RAF Balado Bridge airfield. RAF Balado Bridge was also the locale of a now decommissioned NATO ICBM early warning radar and up until the late 1950s was a training base for the Royal Air Force.

Climate
As with most of the British Isles, Kinross has an oceanic climate (Köppen: Cfb).

Sport and recreation
The Loch Leven Trails offers 21 km (13 miles) of walking and cycling heritage trail around the shoreline of Loch Leven. It begins at RSPB Vane Farm Nature Reserve via Findatie to Kinross Pier/Kirkgate Park.

There is a leisure centre located in Kinross, called Loch Leven Leisure.

Kinross Trout Fishery situated just on the edge of the village is one of Scotland's premier trout fishery giving fly and bait anglers the opportunity to catch some of Scotland largest trout.

Kinross Colts FC is a community football club and registered charity with over 400 boys, girls, men and women playing in 16 teams within the club. They have two grounds locally, The Myre at Smith Street in Kinross and Donaldson Park in Milnathort.

Kinross is also home to Kinross Rugby Club, who play their games at King George V ground alongside Kinross Hockey Club. Locally the ground is known as KGV.

Notable people
Andrew Barlass, American politician and farmer, was born in Kinross.
Steven Caulker lived with his aunt and uncle in Kinross when playing for Dundee F.C.
Rev Henry Christie minister 
Dr Adam Kelso Fulton, Scottish rugby union internationalist 
Peter Leitch, recipient of the Victoria Cross
 George Thompson (VC) whose posthumous Victoria Cross in 1945 is often cited as the best merited of the entire air war. He was the wireless operator in a Lancaster of No. 9 Squadron on a dawn raid against the Dortmund-Ems Canal when the plane was struck by a salvo of two 88 mm shells.
William Whyte (banker) (1878-1945)

Twinned Cities
  Gacé, France
  Traunstein, Germany

Education
 Kinross High School (Now located in Loch Leven Community Campus as of 2010)
 Kinross Primary School

References

External links

Kinross Community Council
Kinross Primary School
Kinross A.F.C

 
County towns in Scotland
Parishes in Kinross-shire